The English and Australian Copper Company was a South Australian based company, established in 1851 from the transfer of assets of the Patent Copper Company (formerly based in Swansea, South Wales). Formed as a joint stock company, with smelting works at Spitty (South Wales) and Kooringa (Burra, South Australia), it also maintained wharves at Port Adelaide and Port Wakefield, where copper ore was largely supplied by the South Australian Mining Association (SAMA).

The Spitty copper works were disposed of in 1855, and most of the company’s operations were transferred to South Australia. In 1861, a copper smelting works was opened in Port Adelaide. However, due to the reduced production of copper ore in the colony, the company’s Kooringa works suspended operations in 1869, and in 1872, a portion of the smelting plant and machinery was transferred to Newcastle, New South Wales, where the Lambton Works opened.

In 1918, the English and Australian Copper Company dissolved and ceased operations as a business.

References

External links 
 SA Memory (State Library of South Australia)
 Burra History (Burra History Group website)

Mining companies of Australia
Copper mines in South Australia
Defunct companies of Australia
Mining in South Australia
Smelting
Companies based in South Australia
Non-renewable resource companies established in 1851
Non-renewable resource companies disestablished in 1918
English-Australian culture
Copper industry
Metal companies of Australia
Economic history of South Australia
Australian companies established in 1851